Sangchris Lake is a 3,022-acre (12.2 km²) reservoir located in Christian and Sangamon Counties, Illinois.  It was created in 1964 by damming Clear Creek, a tributary of the South Fork of the Sangamon River for recreation and to serve as a source for cooling water for an adjacent electrical generating plant powered with coal.  The lake is no more than 7 miles (11 km) long from headwaters to dam, but so jagged is its shore that the lake's total shoreline measures 120 miles (193 km) in length.  Much of the shoreline is now part of Sangchris Lake State Recreation Area.  The nearest town is Kincaid, Illinois.

As of 2013, the lake and state park are operated by the Illinois Department of Natural Resources, and the adjacent 1,108 megawatt Kincaid Power Station is operated by Dominion Resources, an electricity conglomerate.  The lake is known for its crappie, largemouth bass, and striped bass fisheries.

External links
 Illinois DNR - Sangchris Lake

Protected areas of Christian County, Illinois
Reservoirs in Illinois
Protected areas of Sangamon County, Illinois
Bodies of water of Christian County, Illinois
Bodies of water of Sangamon County, Illinois
1964 establishments in Illinois